Sardar AKM Nasiruddin is an Bangladesh Nationalist Party politician and the former Member of Parliament of Faridpur-14 and Shariatpur-1.

Career
Nasiruddin was elected to parliament from Faridpur-14 as a Bangladesh Nationalist Party candidate in 1979. He was elected to parliament from Shariatpur-1 as a Jatiya Party candidate in 1986 and 1988.

References

Independent politicians in Bangladesh
Living people
3rd Jatiya Sangsad members
4th Jatiya Sangsad members
Year of birth missing (living people)
2nd Jatiya Sangsad members